Palafolls is a municipality in the province of Barcelona, Catalonia, eastern Spain.

Twin towns
 Poppi, Italy, since 1990
 Ax-les-Thermes, France

References

External links
Official website 
 Government data pages 

Municipalities in Maresme